Stob Coire an Laoigh is a Scottish mountain in The Grey Corries Range, 15 kilometres north east of Kinlochleven.

At an elevation of  Stob Coire an Laoigh is equal 37th in height (with Aonach Beag) on the Munro table.

See also 
 Ben Nevis
 List of Munro mountains
 Mountains and hills of Scotland

References

Munros
Mountains and hills of the Central Highlands
Mountains and hills of Highland (council area)
One-thousanders of Scotland